Henry Paston-Bedingfeld, 10th baronet, (born 1943), retired King-at-Arms of the College of Arms in London and former member of the Royal Household.

Henry Paston-Bedingfeld may also refer to:

Sir Henry Richard Paston-Bedingfeld, 6th Baronet (1800–1862) of the Paston-Bedingfeld baronets
Sir Henry George Paston-Bedingfeld, 7th Baronet (1830–1902) of the Paston-Bedingfeld baronets
Sir Henry Edward Paston-Bedingfeld, 8th Baronet (1860–1941) of the Paston-Bedingfeld baronets
 Sir Henry Richard Paston-Bedingfeld, 6th Baronet (1800–1862) of the Paston-Bedingfeld baronets
 Sir Henry George Paston-Bedingfeld, 7th Baronet (1830–1902) of the Paston-Bedingfeld baronets

See also
Henry Bedingfeld (disambiguation)